Jared Leigh Cohon (born October 7, 1947) served as the eighth president of Carnegie Mellon University in Pittsburgh, Pennsylvania, United States.  he is a University Professor in the Carnegie Mellon College of Engineering.

He holds a BS in Civil Engineering from the University of Pennsylvania and MS and PhD degrees in Civil and Environmental Engineering from Massachusetts Institute of Technology, earned in 1972 and 1973, respectively.

Prior to Carnegie Mellon, Cohon was the Dean of the School of Forestry and Environmental Studies and professor of environmental systems analysis at Yale University from 1992 to 1997 and was a faculty member in the Department of Geography and Environmental Engineering and Assistant and Associate Dean of Engineering and Vice Provost for Research at Johns Hopkins University from 1973 to 1992.

Cohon stepped down from his position as President of Carnegie Mellon in 2013 and returned to the faculty as a University Professor in the Departments of Civil and Environmental Engineering and Engineering and Public Policy and director of the Wilton E. Scott Institute for Energy Innovation. In 2014, Carnegie Mellon announced that the University Center would be renamed in honor of President Cohon and will be called the Cohon University Center.

Cohon was elected a member of the National Academy of Engineering (2012) for contributions to environmental systems analysis and national policy and leadership in higher education.

References

External links
 President Cohon's Bio at Carnegie Mellon
 Carnegie Mellon Piper: Interview with Jared Cohon (p. 12)
 

1947 births
University of Pennsylvania School of Engineering and Applied Science alumni
MIT School of Engineering alumni
Presidents of Carnegie Mellon University
Yale University faculty
Living people
Fellows of the American Academy of Arts and Sciences